SSPC: The Society for Protective Coatings (SSPC) is a professional association for the industrial protective and marine coatings industry.  It was founded in 1950 as the Steel Structures Painting Council, a non-profit association concerned with the use of coatings to protect steel structures such as bridges, ships, water tanks, and locks and dams. Since the original mission of the organization evolved over the years to include structures built with materials other than steel (concrete, composite materials, etc.), the name was changed in 1997 to SSPC: The Society for Protective Coatings. The organization was originally affiliated with Carnegie Mellon University but is now independent.

As of the end of 2019, there are approximately 16,000 members worldwide.  There are also approximately 960 corporate members. Industrial painting contractors are a primary beneficiary of SSPC's efforts.

Because of significant overlap in mission and services, in April 2020 the membership approved a merger with NACE International, along with members of that organization. The merger formed a new organization in 2021.  NACE and SSPC are now known as AMPP: The Association for Materials Protection and Performance. The NACE and SSPC organizations and brands will be gradually phased out.

Publications
The "official voice of SSPC" is the Journal of Protective Coatings & Linings, published monthly by Technology Publishing Company in Pittsburgh, PA. In addition to standards and the JPCL, SSPC produces books, technical manuals, training courses, professional certification programs and information regarding environmental regulations and health and safety issues that affect the protective coatings industry.  SSPC has also begun developing resources for the commercial-light industrial industry.

Standards
SSPC is an American National Standards Institute accredited standards development organization. SSPC develops and publishes widely used industry standards for surface preparation, coating selection, coating application, painting contractor certification, and testing. Standing committees periodically review and update the standards as required.

Contractor Certification Programs

SSPC offers various certification programs for industrial and commercial contractors, inspection firms, and supplements for the nuclear industry and ISO 9000.

Professional Training and Certification

SSPC offers training and certification for coatings applicators, inspectors, project managers, EHS managers, engineers, and other coatings professionals.

Conferences

In 2011, following the discontinuation of the annual PACE conference, SSPC launched the SSPC Annual Conference featuring GreenCOAT, which is held in the United States each year for SSPC members and affiliates. Starting in 2019, the conference was renamed to Coatings+.

Chapters

Other regional meetings are held throughout the USA and other parts of the world via SSPC's Chapter system.

External links
SSPC: The Society for Protective Coatings Website
The Journal of Protective Coatings & Linings Website
SSPC Online Training Programs
Goldenland House Painters

Organizations established in 1950
International professional associations
Professional associations based in the United States
Paint and coatings industry